The Communications Security Establishment (CSE; , CST), formerly (from 2008-2014) called the Communications Security Establishment Canada (CSEC), is the Government of Canada's national cryptologic agency. It is responsible for foreign signals intelligence (SIGINT) and communications security (COMSEC), protecting federal government electronic information and communication networks, and is the technical authority for cyber security and information assurance.

Administered under the Department of National Defence (DND), the CSE is accountable to the Minister of National Defence through its deputy head, the Chief of CSE. The National Defence Minister is in turn accountable to the Cabinet and Parliament. The current Chief of the CSE is Caroline Xavier, who assumed the office on 31 August 2022.

In 2015, the agency built a new headquarters and campus encompassing .

History
CSE originates from Canada's joint military and civilian code-breaking and intelligence efforts during the Second World War.

Examination Unit 
The Examination Unit (XU) was established during the Second World War, in June 1941, as a branch of the National Research Council. It was the first civilian office in Canada solely dedicated to decryption of communications signals; until then, SIGINT was entirely within the purview of the Canadian military, and mostly limited to intercepts.

In March 1942, XU moved next door to Laurier House in Sandy Hill, Ottawa; this location was chosen because they felt it would draw no suspicion to the enemies. In September, the Department of External Affairs established its Special Intelligence Section at XU with the purpose of reviewing decoded SIGINT with other collateral information to produce intelligence summaries.

The original mandate of the Examination Unit was to intercept the communications of Vichy France and Germany. Its mandate later expanded to include interception and decryption of Japanese communications after Japan entered the war. The unit was estimated to have had 50 staff members at any one time. In total 77 people worked there.

By 1945, the disparate SIGINT collection units of the Canadian Navy, Army, and Air Force, were consolidated into the Joint Discrimination Unit (JDU), which was headquartered in Ottawa in the same building as the XU. By the end of the War, the military JDU and the civilian XU were able to coordinate SIGINT collection, analysis, and dissemination so efficiently that it led officials to consider the establishment of peacetime SIGINT operations. In September 1945, U.S. President Harry Truman declared it would be vital to carry out such operations, and Canadian authorities came to the same conclusion in December later that year.

On 13 April 1946, a secret Order in Council allowed for postwar continuation of wartime cryptologic efforts and thus the Communications Branch of the National Research Council of Canada (CBNRC) was founded. This agency would be the predecessor to today's Communications Security Establishment (CSE).

Communications Branch of the National Research Council 
Beginning operations on 3 September 1946, the Communications Branch of the National Research Council (CBNRC) was the first peace-time cryptologic agency and was kept secret for much of its beginning. The CBNRC was established through a secret Order in Council signed on 13 April 1946, combining the civilian Examination Unit (XU) and the military Joint Discrimination Unit (JDU) and was located at LaSalle Academy.

With Edward Drake as its first director, the agency worked with intercepted foreign electronic communications, collected largely from the Royal Canadian Signal Corps (RCCS) station at Rockcliffe Airport in Ottawa. CSE also worked with Canadian Forces Station Leitrim (CFS Leitrim; formerly 1 Special Wireless Station till 1949, and Ottawa Wireless Station till 1966), Canada's oldest operational signal intelligence (SIGINT) collection station, established by the RCCS in 1941 and located just south of Ottawa. In 1946, the station's complement was 75 personnel (compared to its around 2,000 employees in 2013–2014). This unit successfully decrypted, translated, and analyzed these foreign signals, and turned that raw information into useful intelligence reports during the course of the war.

CBNRC finally began domestic COMSEC efforts on 1 January 1947. During the Cold War, the CBNRC was primarily responsible for providing SIGINT data to the Department of National Defence regarding the military operations of the Soviet Union.

In February 1950, R. S. McLaren was appointed the first CBNRC Senior Liaison Officer (CBSLO) to Washington, D.C. In March 1962: CBNRC installed its first IBM supercomputer, costing CA$372k. In December 1964, CBNRC began collaboration on "Canadian ALVIS" (CID 610), the first and only Canadian cipher machine to be mass-produced; based on the British ALVIS (BID 610).

CBNRC and the information it gathered and shared was kept secret for 34 years until 9 January 1974, when the CBC Television documentary show, The Fifth Estate, aired an episode focused on the organization, with research by James Dubro. This was the first time that the organization had ever been mentioned in public. This resulted in an outcry in the House of Common and an admission by the Canadian government that the organization existed.

Communications Security Establishment 
In 1975, the CBNRC was transferred to the Department of National Defence (DND) by an Order in Council, and became the Communications Security Establishment. CSE was now publicly known, and had diversified since the Cold War becoming the primary SIGINT resource in Canada.

In 1988, CSE created the Canadian System Security Centre to establish a Canadian computer security standard among other goals. This led to the publication of the Canadian Trusted Computer Product Evaluation Criteria.

Following the September 11 attacks in 2001, Canada's Anti-terrorism Act (ATA) was ratified, receiving royal assent on 18 December 2001. It amended the National Defence Act to formally acknowledge and mandate the activities of CSE. It also made amendments to the Canadian Security Intelligence Service Act, the Criminal Code, and the Official Secrets Act (later the Security of Information Act).

Since mid-2014, the organization has used its legal name (Communications Security Establishment) and initials (CSE) on its website and in public statements.

In November 2011, CSE was made an independent agency, though still operating under the National Defence portfolio and constrained by the National Defence Act.

In June 2019, the Communications Security Establishment Act was passed as part of an omnibus national security bill called the National Security Act 2017. Coming into force two months later, in August, the act set out the mandate and powers of CSE. As part of the omnibus bill, oversight of CSE activities was assumed by the newly created National Security and Intelligence Review Agency (NSIRA).

Insignia 

CSE uses generic identifiers imposed by the Federal Identity Program. However, CSE is one of several federal departments and agencies (primarily those having law enforcement, security, or regulatory functions) that have been granted a badge by the Canadian Heraldic Authority. The badge was granted in 1994, while CSE's pennant was first raised in 1996 to mark the organization's 50th anniversary.

From the 1990s to the mid 2000s, CSE's Information Technology Security program used a logo to identify its products and publications; the triangle represented threats, while the arc symbolized protection.

Operations
Unique within Canada's security and intelligence community, the Communications Security Establishment employs code-makers and code-breakers (cryptanalysis) to provide the Government of Canada with information technology security (IT Security) and foreign signals intelligence services. CSE also provides technical and operational assistance to the Royal Canadian Mounted Police and federal law enforcement and security agencies, including the Canada Border Services Agency and the Canadian Air Transport Security Authority.

Signal intelligence
CSE's SIGINT program produces intelligence that responds to Canadian government requirements. At CFS Leitrim, the main military SIGINT facility in the south end of Ottawa, the establishment collects foreign intelligence that can be used by the government for strategic warning, policy formulation, decision-making in the fields of national security and national defence, and day-to-day assessment of foreign capabilities and intentions. The station at Leitrim specializes in intercepting electronic communications to and from embassies in Ottawa. Other Canadian military SIGINT facilities are located at: CFB Gander Newfoundland with a detachment from CFS Leitrim, CFS Masset, BC (under remote control from CFS Leitrim) and CFS Alert, Nunavut.

CSE relies on its closest foreign intelligence allies, the US, UK, Australia and New Zealand to share the collection burden and the resulting intelligence yield. Canada is a substantial beneficiary and participant of the collaborative effort within the partnership to collect and report on foreign communications.

During the Cold War, CSE's primary client for signals intelligence was National Defence, and its focus was the military operations of the then Soviet Union. Since the end of the Cold War, Government of Canada requirements have evolved to include a wide variety of political, defence, and security issues of interest to a much broader range of client departments.

While these continue to be key intelligence priorities for Government of Canada decision-makers, increasing focus on protecting the safety of Canadians is prompting greater interest in intelligence on transnational issues, including terrorism.

Code breaking equipment
CSE code breaking capabilities degraded substantially in the 1960s and 1970s but were upgraded with the acquisition of a Cray X-MP/11 (modified) supercomputer delivered to the Sir Leonard Tilley building in March 1985 and the hiring of code breaking analysts. It was, at the time, the most powerful computer in Canada. In the early 1990s, the Establishment purchased a Floating Point Systems FPS 522-EA supercomputer at a cost of $1,620,371. This machine was upgraded to a Cray S-MP superserver after Cray acquired Floating Point Systems in December 1991 and used the Folklore Operating System supplied by the NSA in the US. These machines are now retired.

Little information is available on the types of computers used by the CSE since then. However, Cray in the US has produced a number of improved supercomputers since then. These include the Cray SX-6, early 2000s, the Cray X1, 2003 (development funded in part by the NSA), Cray XD1, 2004, Cray XT3, Cray XT4, 2006, Cray XMt, 2006 and Cray CX1, 2008. It is possible that some of these models have been used by the CSE and are in use today.

Canadian Centre for Cyber Security 

The Canadian Centre for Cyber Security (CCCS or Cyber Centre) is the Government of Canada authority responsible for monitoring threats, protecting national critical infrastructure against cyber incidents, and coordinating the national response to any incidents related to cyber security.

As a unit under the Communications Security Establishment (CSE), the agency is Canada's computer emergency response team (CSIRT) and the Canadian government's computer Incident response team (CIRT).

Officially created on 1 October 2018, CCCS consolidated the existing operational cyber-security units of several federal government organizations, including Public Safety Canada's Canadian Cyber Incident Response Centre, Shared Services Canada's Security Operations Centre, and the CSE's Information Technology Security branch.

History
Formerly known as communications security (COMSEC), the CSE's Information Technology Security branch grew out of a need to protect sensitive information transmitted by various agencies of the government, especially the Department of Foreign Affairs and International Trade (DFAIT), Canada Border Services Agency (CBSA), DND, and the Royal Canadian Mounted Police (RCMP).

The Cyber Centre was developed in response to CSE's consultations with Canadians in 2016 which identified various issues pertaining to cyber security in relation to the federal government, including accountability, departmental coordination, and leadership. In February 2018, the federal budget allocated funds for CSE, in collaboration with Public Safety Canada and Shared Services Canada, to launch the Cyber Centre.

Officially created on 1 October 2018, CCCS consolidated the existing operational cyber-security units of several federal government organizations, including the Canadian Cyber Incident Response Centre of Public Safety Canada; the Security Operations Centre of Shared Services Canada; and the Information Technology Security branch of CSE.

Prior to opening, in June 2018, Minister Ralph Goodale appointed Scott Jones the head of the new Centre.

Tutte Institute for Mathematics and Computing 
The Tutte Institute for Mathematics and Computing (TIMC) is a research institute programme of the Government of Canada responsible for conducting classified research in the areas of cryptology and knowledge discovery to support the Canadian Cryptologic Program and its Five-Eyes international partners.

Though officially founded in 2009, TIMC officially opened and formally named in September 2011. Named after cryptanalyst and mathematician William T. Tutte, TIMC is based within CSE's Edward Drake Building in Ottawa.

Sponsored and funded by the Communications Security Establishment, the institute is partnered with Institutes for Defence Analyses, CCR Princeton, CCR La Jolla, CCS Bowie, the Heilbronn Institute for Mathematical Research, Carleton University, and the University of Calgary and is working to create partnerships with other research institutes, government agencies and universities.

Researchers Leland McInnes and John Healy at the Tutte Institute developed a technique called Uniform Manifold Approximation and Projection (UMAP), originally designed to analyze malware. The algorithm and software of UMAP has since been released by TIMC to the open-source community, and is now being used to answer questions about COVID-19.

Facilities 
CSE occupies several buildings in Ottawa, including the Edward Drake Building and the neighbouring Sir Leonard Tilley Building.

CSE moved to the Tilley Building in June 1961. On 26 February 2015, CSE officially inaugurated the Edward Drake Building, named for Lt. Colonel Edward Drake, a pioneer of the Canadian signals intelligence.

With the rapid expansion in the number of CSE personnel since the 9/11 attack in the US, the CSE has built new facilities. A new CA$1.2 billion facility, encompassing , has been built in the eastern part of Ottawa, immediately west of the headquarters building for the Canadian Security Intelligence Service. Construction began in early 2011 and was completed in 2015.

Governance and mandate

Legislation 
In addition to those mentioned below, CSE is bound by all other Canadian laws, including the Criminal Code, the Canadian Charter of Rights and Freedoms, the Privacy Act, Security of Information Act, and the Avoiding Complicity in Mistreatment by Foreign Entities Act.

In December 2001, the Canadian government passed omnibus bill C-36 into law as the Anti-Terrorism Act. The Act amended portions of the National Defence Act and officially recognized CSE's three-part mandate:
 To acquire and use information from the global information infrastructure for the purpose of providing foreign intelligence, in accordance with Government of Canada intelligence priorities.
 To provide advice, guidance and services to help ensure the protection of electronic information and of information infrastructures of importance to the Government of Canada.
 To provide technical and operational assistance to federal law enforcement and security agencies in the performance of their lawful duties.

The Anti-Terrorism Act also strengthened CSE's capacity to engage in the war on terrorism by providing needed authorities to fulfill its mandate.

In the 2007 Proceedings of the Canadian Senate Standing Committee on National Security and Defence, then-CSE Chief John Adams indicated that the CSE is collecting communications data when he suggested that the legislation was not perfect in regard to interception of information relating to the "envelope."

Communications Security Establishment Act 
In June 2019, the Communications Security Establishment Act (CSE Act) was passed, as part of the National Security Act 2017. The Act, which came into force two months after passing, notes that there are five aspects of CSE's mandate:
The acquisition of foreign intelligence (SIGINT)
Cybersecurity and information assurance to help protect electronic information and information infrastructures of the Canadian government and those designated to be of importance to the government
Defensive cyber operations
Active cyber operations
Technical and operational assistance to federal law enforcement and security agencies, the Canadian Forces, and the Department of National Defence.

The CSE Act requires that CSE activities do not target Canadians anywhere in the world, or any person in Canada, "unless there are reasons to believe that there is an imminent danger of death or serious bodily harm. The Act also requires the CSE protect the privacy of Canadians and persons in Canada. As such, CSE is forbidden, by law, to intercept domestic communications. When intercepting communications between a domestic and foreign source, the domestic communications are destroyed or otherwise ignored. (After the September 11 attacks on the United States in 2001, however, CSE's powers expanded to allow the interception of foreign communications that begin or end in Canada, as long as the other party is outside the border and ministerial authorization is issued specifically for this case and purpose.)

Governance and oversight
The Minister of National Defence guides and authorizes the activities of CSE using ministerial directives, ministerial authorizations, and ministerial orders, all of which are based on the "government’s intelligence priorities as set out by Cabinet through discussion and consultations with the security and intelligence community." The Defence Minister cannot authorize any activities that are not included in the CSE mandate or grant CSE any powers that do not exist in Canadian law.

Ministerial directives are how the Minister of National Defence instructs the Chief of CSE.

CSE operates under a system of independent oversight:

 National Security and Intelligence Review Agency (NSIRA) – NSIRA is fully independent of government and of CSE. Its committee members are appointed by the sitting Prime Minister in consultation with Parliamentary leaders, and handle complaints against all Canadian national security agencies.
 Intelligence Commissioner – the Intelligence Commissioner is independent of CSE and has oversight of all national security and intelligence gathering activities of the Government of Canada, including CSE. The Commissioner issues an annual report to the Prime Minister, who must table it in Parliament after removing confidential and classified information. The Commissioner is entitled to receive all reports that are compiled by NSIRA.
 National Security and Intelligence Committee of Parliamentarians (NSICOP) – NSICOP is a committee of Parliamentarians that have the security clearances to review and report on any aspect of CSE's activities.

CSE activities are also subject to several external oversight and review bodies.

As with any other federal department or agency of Canada, the activities of CSE are also subject to review by various federal bodies, including:

 the Privacy Commissioner
 the Information Commissioner
 the Auditor General
 the Canadian Human Rights Commission
 the Commissioner of Official Languages

Heads of the CSE

Communications Security Establishment Commissioner
The Commissioner provided an annual public report on his activities and findings to Parliament, through the Minister of National Defence.

Between 1996 and 2019, there were six Commissioners:
 Claude Bisson (1996 June 19 – 2003)
 Antonio Lamer (2003 June 19 – 2006)
 Charles Gonthier (2006 August 1 – 2009)
 Peter Cory (2009 December 14 – 2010)
 Robert Décary (2010 June 18 – 2013)
 Jean-Pierre Plouffe (2013–2019)

As part of an omnibus national security bill (the National Security Act 2017) passed by Parliament in 2019, the OCSEC was abolished and its responsibilities divided between two newly created entities: employees of the OCSEC were transferred to the Office of the Intelligence Commissioner; and the review functions of the former OCSEC were assumed by the National Security and Intelligence Review Agency (NSIRA).

The previous Commissioner of CSE, Jean-Pierre Plouffe, was appointed to the role of Intelligence Commissioner on 18 July 2019.

ECHELON

Under the 1948 UKUSA agreement, CSE's intelligence is shared with the U.S. National Security Agency (NSA), the British Government Communications Headquarters (GCHQ), the Australian Signals Directorate (ASD), and New Zealand's Government Communications Security Bureau (GCSB).

Along with these services from the United States, the UK, New Zealand, and Australia, CSE is believed to form the ECHELON system. Its capabilities are suspected to include the ability to monitor a large proportion of the world's transmitted civilian telephone, fax and data traffic.  The intercepted data, or "dictionaries" are "reported linked together through a high-powered array of computers known as 'Platform'."

Controversies
CBNRC and the information it gathered and shared was kept secret for 34 years until 9 January 1974, when the CBC Television documentary show, The Fifth Estate, aired an episode focused on the organization, with research by James Dubro. This was the first time that the organization had ever been mentioned in public. This resulted in an outcry in the House of Commons and an admission by the Canadian government that the organization existed.

A former employee of the organization, Mike Frost, claimed in a 1994 book, Spyworld, that the agency eavesdropped on Margaret Trudeau to find out if she smoked marijuana and that CSE had monitored two of former British prime minister Margaret Thatcher's dissenting cabinet ministers in London on behalf of the UK's secret service.

In 1996, it was suggested that CSE had monitored all communications between National Defence Headquarters and Somalia, and were withholding information from the Somalia Inquiry into the killing of two unarmed Somalis by Canadian soldiers.

In 2006, CTV Montreal's program On Your Side conducted a three-part documentary on CSE naming it "Canada's most secretive spy agency" and that "this ultra-secret agency has now become very powerful," conducting surveillance by monitoring phone calls, e-mails, chat groups, radio, microwave, and satellite.

In 2007, former Ontario lieutenant-governor, James Bartleman, testified at the Air India Inquiry on May 3 that he saw a CSE communications intercept warning of the June 22, 1985 bombing of Air India Flight 182 before it occurred. Two former CSE employees have since testified that no CSE report was ever produced.

In 2013, a coalition of civil liberties associations launched a campaign directed against the government's perceived lack of transparency on issues related to the agency, demanding more information on its purported domestic surveillance activities.

Further criticism has arisen surrounding the construction costs of the agency's new headquarters in Ottawa. The project is slated to cost over CA$1.1 billion, making it the most expensive government building in Canadian history.

In 2014, a leaked, top-secret presentation entitled “IP Profiling Analytics & Mission Impacts” summarized experiments tracking the cellphones of travellers passing through Toronto Pearson International Airport. Critics argued that the experiment was invasive and indiscriminate, while CSE countered that it was consistent with all relevant laws and mandates.

In 2016, the CSE Commissioner found that one of the agency's metadata activities did not comply with the law. Specifically, CSE had failed to properly minimize certain Canadian identity information before sending it to foreign governments, contravening parts of the National Defence Act and the Privacy Act.

Media portrayal
In The Good Wife episode "Landing," both the NSA and the CSE are shown monitoring personal phone calls and hacking private cell phones' recording devices in order to listen in on personal conversations. One plaintiff describes the CSE as "the Canadian version of the NSA."

See also
 Badge of the Communications Security Establishment
 Canadian Forces Information Management Group
 Canadian Security Intelligence Service (CSIS)
 CFS Leitrim
 Cray
 ECHELON
 Royal Canadian Mounted Police (RCMP)
 RCMP Security Service
 Security clearances
 Security of Information Act
 Treasury Board
 List of intelligence agencies
 FAPSI (Russia)
 GCHQ (UK)
 National Security Agency (US)

References

External links
 
 

 
Department of National Defence (Canada)
Federal departments and agencies of Canada
Canada
Canadian intelligence agencies
Government agencies established in 1946
Canada
Military intelligence agencies
1946 establishments in Ontario

pt:CSE